Coosa County School District  is a school district in Coosa County, Alabama which serves the community of Rockford. It operates four schools: Central Elementary School, Central Middle School, Central High School and the Coosa County Career and Tech Center.

External links
 

School districts in Alabama